Calabresi's bullfrog (Pyxicephalus obbianus) is a species of frogs in the family Pyxicephalidae. It is endemic to northeastern and central Somalia.

This uncommon species breeds in temporary ponds. Outside the breeding season, it is fossorial, and little is known about its habitat. It is assumed live in dry savannah and semi-arid habitats. Significant threats to it are unlikely, although livestock grazing, and perhaps fire and droughts, might have an impact.

References

Pyxicephalus
Frogs of Africa
Amphibians of Somalia
Endemic fauna of Somalia
Amphibians described in 1927
Taxonomy articles created by Polbot